Plum Analytics is a Philadelphia, Pennsylvania-based altmetrics company dedicated to measuring the influence of scientific research.

History 
It was founded in 2011 by Andrea Michalek, who is its current president, and Mike Buschman. It was acquired by Elsevier in February 2017, which purchased it from EBSCO Information Services for an undisclosed amount. Its metrics were immediately incorporated into Elsevier's existing products, including Mendeley and Scopus.

Product and services

PlumX 
Plum Analytics is best known for PlumX, which was the company's first product. PlumX is an online tool that provides altmetrics for peer-reviewed journal articles and other scholarly works  by aggregating information from different sources including Wikipedia. In August 2015, Plum Analytics released the "PlumX Suite", which consists of five separate products: Metrics, Dashboards, +Grants, Benchmarks, and Funding Opportunities.

See also 
 figshare
 Altmetrics

References

External links

Twitter Page

Analytics companies
2011 establishments in Pennsylvania
American companies established in 2011
Companies based in Philadelphia
Elsevier
Academic publishing
Scholarly communication